Brantford Township may refer to:

Canada
Brantford Township, Ontario

United States
Brantford Township, Washington County, Kansas, in Washington County, Kansas
Brantford Township, Hamlin County, South Dakota, in Hamlin County, South Dakota

Township name disambiguation pages